Three submarines of the French Navy have borne the name Émeraude:

 , an  launched in 1906 and sold for scrap in 1923
 French submarine Émeraude, an  destroyed incomplete on the slip in 1940
 , a  launched in 1986

French Navy ship names